The 1937–38 Scottish Districts season is a record of all the rugby union matches for Scotland's district teams.

History

Glasgow District beat Edinburgh District in the Inter-City match.

The North of Scotland District versus Midlands District match is interesting because it involves the use of a substitution. North's fly-half Brander took a head injury in the second half of the match and was replaced by T. A. Findlay of Gordonians.

Results

Inter-City

Glasgow District: A. H. Piper (West of Scotland), Archibald Drummond (Kelvinside Academicals), George Crerar (Glasgow Academicals), Ian Shaw (Glasgow HSFP), R. A. Clement (Glasgow Academicals), Robert Wilson Shaw (Glasgow HSFP), I. E. Dawson (Hillhead HSFP), R.C. Graham (Hillhead HSFP), I. Wilkie (Hillhead HSFP), I. M. Sloan (Kelvinside Academicals), Vivian Weston (Kelvinside Academicals), H.C. Kennedy (Glasgow HSFP), I. Mackay (Glasgow HSFP), W. R. Simpson (Glasgow HSFP), T. R. Graham (Hutchesons' GSFP)

Edinburgh District: George Roberts (Watsonians), G. H. Caithness (Edinburgh City Police), T. C. Brown (Watsonians), E. C. Hunter (Watsonians), J. B. Greig (Heriots), I. G. P. Thomson (Melville College F.P.), J. L. McInnes (Boroughmuir), Jake Borthwick (Stewart's College F.P.), Peter Tait (Royal HSFP), R. Bisset (Royal HSFP), D. K. A. MacKenzie (Edinburgh Wanderers), J. Craig (Stewart's College F.P.), D. Robertson (Watsonians), H. A. W. Miller (Heriots), G. C. Brown (Heriots)

Other Scottish matches

North of Scotland District: J. A. Innes (Aberdeen GSFP), D. Campbell (Gordonians), H. W. Booth (Aberdeen University), J. A. K. Hunter (Gordonians), R. B. Thomson (Gordonians), J. J. Wright (Moray), D. A. G. Brander (Aberdeen GSFP), W. J. D. Anderson (Gordonians), H. Craig (Aberdeenshire), J. C. Cursiter (Moray), G. G. B. Gunn (Gordonians), J. W. Hall (Highland), W. S. Milne (Gordonians), I. McKenzie (Highland), G. A. Rowton (Aberdeen GSFP) - T. A. Findlay (Gordonians) replaced Brander after a head injury.

Midlands District: J. Paterson (Alloa), R. Robertson (St Andrews University), W. N. Louden (St Andrews University), A. I. Abbott (Panmure), and N. A. Gillanders (Panmure), A. H. M. Heap (St Andrews University) and E. R. Winton (St Andrews University), C. Armour (St Andrews University), A. Clark (Perth Academicals), Maurice Henderson (Dunfermline), J. G. Kerr (St Andrews University), G. Mitchell (Dunfermline), J. Ness (Dunfermline), G. Officer (Montrose), and J Stewart (Cupar).

North of Scotland District: J. A. Innes (Aberdeen GSFP), N. A. Gillanders (Panmure), A. I. Abbot (Panmure), Duncan Macrae (St. Andrews University), R. B. Thomson (Gordonians), R. S. Lind (Dunfermline), E. R. Winton (St. Andrews University), J. W. Hall (Highland), I. McKenzie (Highland), W. S. Milne (Gordonians), J. R. Ness (Dunfermline), Maurice Henderson (Dunfermline), G. Mitchell (Dunfermline), G. Officer (Montrose), C. Armour (St. Andrews University)

South of Scotland District: J. Dun (Gala), A. I. Dickie (Gala), W. W. Bookless (Gala), C. W. Drummond (Melrose), J. Edwards (Selkirk), G. A. D. Lamb (Melrose), Tom Dorward (Gala), R. Cowe (Melrose), A. Stewart (Selkirk), R. G. Nicholson (Gala), Jock Beattie (Hawick) [captain], S. M. Roberts (Selkirk), T. Henderson (Selkirk), A. B. Tod (Gala), J. Campbell (Kelso)

Junior matches

South of Scotland District: G. Wilson (Hawick Linden); R. McBain (Gala Star), E. W. Marsden (Hawick YMCA), J. Lyall (Hawick Linden), G. Brown (Hawick Linden), J. Grossart (Gala Star), J. Hogarth (Gala Star), W. Sharp (Peebles), G. K. Brunton (Walkerburn), F. Pow (Walkerburn), R. Nicholson (Peebles), D. D. Fleming (Earlston), C. Anderson (Hawick Linden), W. Ballantyre (Hawick Y.M.C.A.), and R. W. Lumsden (Gala Star).

Edinburgh District: G. L. Kemp (Edinburgh City Police), G. H. Caithness (Edinburgh City Police), G. Kerr (Edinburgh City Police), D. B. Smith (Lasswade), G. McLean (Trinity Academicals), M. Cooper (Leith Academicals), J. L. Innes (Boroughmuir) [captain], J. Wallace (Leith Academicals), A. T. Fisher (Barnton Park), D. Barclay (Penicuik), C. B. Pearson (R. D. V. C.) . J. Purves (Dunbar), C . Mitchell (Northern), C. Crawford (Edinburgh City Police), T. McMorran (Kenmore)

Rest of the West: D. M. Duncan (Lenzie), N. Lewis (Hutchesons' GSFP), W. A. Edward (Hutchesons' GSFP), E. H. Kitson (Cambuslung), A. F. Currie (Kilmarnock), R. J. Jamieson (Cambuslang), R. H. Reid (Cambuslang) J.W. Brown (Hutchesons' GSFP) [captain], W. H. Carruthers (Lenzie), G. Hedges  (Ayr), J. B. Burnett (Kilmarnock), I. Turner (Kilmarnock), I. A. Nicholl (Cartha), J. McClure (Ayr), W. G. Rowan (Hutchesons' GSFP)

Glasgow District: I. Work (Uddingston), A P. Fairlie (Shawlands A. F.P.) [captain], W. Mitchell (Bellahouslon Acads.), J. Ferguson (Albert Road Acads.), R. Dunlop (Jordanhill T.C.), W. Liddle (Albert Road Acads.), J. C. Hamilton (Albert Road Acads.), T. Drife (Glasgow Police), K. G. McKenzie (Whitecraigs), J. C. Law (Whitehill F.P.), J. Caldwell (Uddingston), G. Speed (Glasgow Police), W. Sillar (Hamilton Acads.), J. B. Hamilton (Glasgow Police), T. G. Scott (Blairhill)

East of Scotland District: G. L. Kemp (Edinburgh City Police), G. H. Caithness (Edinburgh City Police), E. W. Marsden (Hawick Y.M.C.A.) [captain], D. B. Smith (Lasswade), C. McLean (Trinity Academicals), M. Cooper (Leith Academicals), J. L. McInnes (Boroughmuir), W. Sharp (Peebles), G. K. Brunton (Walkerburn), J. Wallace (Leith Academicals), R. Nicholson (Peebles), D. Barclay (Penicuik), A. T. Fisher (Barnton Park), C. Crawford (Edinburgh City Police), C. Mitchell (Edinburgh Northern)

West of Scotland District: D. M. Duncan (Lenzie), A. F. Currie (Kilmarnock), J. Ferguson (Albert Road Academicals), W. Mitchell (Bellahouston Academicals), A. P. Fairlie (Shawlands Academy F.P.), W. Liddle (Albert Road Academicals), J. C. Hamilton (Albert Road Academicals), J. W. Brown (Hutchesons' GSFP) [captain], W. H. Carruthers (Lenzie), G. Hedges (Ayr), J. B. Burnett (Kilmarnock), J. C. Law (Whitehill School F.P.), W. G. Rowan (Hutchesons' GSFP), J. McClure (Ayr), T. R. Graham (Hutchesons' GSFP)

Trial matches

Scotland Probables: Charles Grieve (Duke of Wellington's Regt.), Archibald Drummond (Kelvinside Academicals), Charles Dick (Guy's Hospital), Duncan Macrae (St Andrews University), Robert Wilson Shaw (Glasgow HSFP), Rab Bruce Lockhart (Cambridge University), Tom Dorward (Gala), J. A. Reid (London Scottish), Peter Tait (Royal HSFP), William Inglis (Royal Engineers), Christian Melville (Black Watch), George Horsburgh (London Scottish), William Young (Cambridge University), Jock Waters (Selkirk), Maurice Henderson (Dunfermline)

Scotland Possibles: J. Dun (Gala), G. H. Caithness (Edinburgh Police), T. C. Brown (Watsonians), E. C. Hunter (Watsonians), N. A. Gillanders (Panmure), I. G. P. Thomson (Melville F.P.), K. S. H. Wilson (Watsonians), R. Cowe (Melrose), Bob Grieve (Kelso), Allan Roy (Waterloo), Jock Beattie (Hawick), G. Officer (Montrose), Duncan Shaw (Sale), D. K. A. MacKenzie (Edinburgh Wanderers), Wilf Crawford (United Services)

Scotland Probables: Charles Grieve (Oxford University), Archibald Drummond (Kelvinside Academicals), Charles Dick (Guy's Hospital), Duncan Macrae (St Andrews University), Robert Dryden (Watsonians) and after 10 minutes on Dryden's injury N. A. Gillanders (Panmure), Rab Bruce Lockhart (Cambridge University), Ross Logan (Edinburgh Wanderers), J. A. Reid (London Scottish), Peter Tait (Royal HSFP), William Blackadder (West of Scotland), Christian Melville (Black Watch), George Horsburgh (London Scottish), William Young (Cambridge University), Jock Waters (Selkirk), Maurice Henderson (Dunfermline) - later J. Dun (Gala), Bob Grieve (Kelso), Jock Beattie (Hawick) and Wilf Crawford (United Services) played for the Probables in the second half.

Scotland Possibles: J. Dun (Gala); Johnny Johnston (Cambridge University), E. C. Hunter (Watsonians), John Forrest (Cambridge University), William Renwick (Edinburgh Wanderers), Robert Wilson Shaw (Glasgow HSFP), K. S. H. Wilson (Watsonians), R. Cowe (Melrose), Bob Grieve (Kelso), Jake Borthwick (Stewart's College F.P.), Jock Beattie (Hawick), Allan Roy (Waterloo), Duncan Shaw (Sale), Laurie Duff (Glasgow Academicals), Wilf Crawford (United Services) - later George Roberts (Watsonians), I.G.P. Thomson (Melville F.P.), Tom Dorward (Gala), John Hastie (Melrose) also used. Rab Bruce Lockhart (Cambridge University), William Blackadder (West of Scotland), George Horsburgh (London Scottish) and Maurice Henderson (Dunfermline) played for the Possibles in the second half.

English matches

No other District matches played.

International matches

No touring matches this season.

References

1937–38 in Scottish rugby union
Scottish Districts seasons